The Greater Southern Waterfront (abbreviation: GSW)  is a major waterfront project under development situated in southern Singapore, straddling its coastline. At present, the area is occupied by the Tanjong Pagar and Brani terminals of the Port of Singapore, which will be progressively moved to the Tuas Megaport, as well as Keppel Golf Club.

History
First announced in 2013 by Prime Minister Lee Hsien Loong, the GSW will be constructed in phases as container port activities are progressively relocated from Tanjong Pagar, Keppel, Pulau Brani and Pasir Panjang to a consolidated port in Tuas known as Tuas Megaport.

Overview
The GSW would be completed in various phases. It will consist of new housing, commercial, cultural and entertainment structures. One such sub-project, known as the Sentosa–Brani Master Plan, also forms a part of the GSW. The GSW is not yet a planning area of its own.

Keppel Golf Club
In 2019, Prime Minister Lee Hsien Loong announced that 9,000 housing apartments, both public and private, will be built on the site of Keppel Golf Club as part of the GSW. In 2022, the Housing and Development Board (HDB) announced that out of the 9,000, 6,000 will be public and launched by 2025; the remaining 3,000 will be private.

See also
Jurong Lake District (JLD) – another major development project in western Singapore
Punggol Coast MRT station – which will be located within the Punggol Digital District (PDD)

References

External links
Greater Southern Waterfront
Greater Southern Waterfront & key projects that have shaped Singapore
Singapore 2030: How the city will transform in the next decade

Bukit Merah
Central Region, Singapore